Xanionotum hystrix is species of Phoridae described by Brues in 1902

Xanionotum hystrix is the type species of the genus Xanionotum.

References

External links
 Xanionotum hystrix page on Animal Diversity Web website

Phoridae
Species described in 1902